Psilochorus pullulus is a species of spider in the family Pholcidae.

Description
The flattened carapace is nearly circular and pale yellowish brown.

Behavior
While they are often found in the vicinity of old abandoned buildings, they are not found indoors, but live under boards, stones or trash, often associated with Loxosceles. When disturbed they usually run rapidly to a hiding place, but at times crouch motionless.

Distribution
Like almost all species of Psilochorus, P. pullulus is a New World species. It is found in the Eastern United States from Maryland to Georgia and west to Nebraska, Colorado and Arizona, and southward to Argentina.

Name
The species name is derived from Latin pullulus "producing young".

Notes

References
  (1963): Spiders of The University of Kansas Natural History Reservation and Rockefeller Experimental Tract.
  (2009): The world spider catalog, version 9.5. American Museum of Natural History.

Pholcidae
Spiders of North America
Spiders of Central America
Spiders of South America
Spiders described in 1850